Mark Hayter (born 7 November 1963) is a British academic. He is Head of Nursing at the Manchester Metropolitan University. He serves as editor-in-chief of the Journal of Clinical Nursing and on the editorial boards of Journal of School Nursing, and Nursing Outlook. Hayter is best known for his research on sexual health including psychosexual health, adolescent reproductive health, family planning, contraceptive counseling, and HIV. He was a founding member of The Lancet Commission on Nursing.

Education
Hayter is a Registered Nurse, holds a BA in social dimensions of health from Sheffield Hallam University, and a MMed.Sci in clinical nursing and PhD from the University of Sheffield.

Professional life
Hayter served as Head of Department, Nursing (2013 -2016) and Associate Dean of Research (2016-2020) and was most recently Professor of Nursing and Health Research, Faculty of Health Sciences, University of Hull. He is an international expert in qualitative research, and has offered highly-cited guidance on the subject. Hayter is a regular contributor to The Conversation, arguing that nurses should take the HIV self-test to role-model sexual health behaviors to their patients. He is also a regular contributor to The Guardian encouraging the National Health Service to support an increase in the number and the quality of the training of nurses.

Awards and recognition
Hayter is a fellow of the Royal College of Nursing (2021), a fellow of the American Academy of Nursing (2013), a Fellow of the Royal Society of Arts a fellow of the European Academy of Nursing Science and a Fellow of the Royal College of Surgeons in Ireland Faculty of Nursing and Midwifery ad eundem (2020). He has served on numerous international scientific committees including the Royal College of Nursing research conference (2010 and 2012), the International School Nurse Conference (2011) and the World Association for Sexual Health Conference (2011).

Bibliography
Hayter has 160 publications listed on Web of Science that have been cited more than 2000 times, giving him an h-index of 27. His three most-cited articles are:
<li>
<li>
<li>

References

External links

Google Scholar
ResearcherID

Academics of the University of Hull
English nurses
1963 births
Nursing researchers
Living people
Alumni of the University of Sheffield
Fellows of the American Academy of Nursing
Fellows of the Royal College of Nursing
British nurses